Aeolochroma viridimedia is a moth of the family Geometridae first described by Louis Beethoven  in 1916. It is found on New Guinea and on Buru.

Subspecies
Aeolochroma viridimedia viridimedia (New Guinea)
Aeolochroma viridimedia recta Prout, 1929 (Buru)

References

Moths described in 1916
Pseudoterpnini
Moths of New Guinea
Moths of Indonesia